The Ministry of Culture (short name MinCultura) is the national executive ministry of the Government of Colombia charged with preserving, promoting, and encouraging the growth, free expression and understanding of the culture of Colombia in all its multi-ethnic forms.

Ministers

References

 
Colombia, Culture
Colombia
Culture
1997 establishments in Colombia